Vincent Doukantié (born 1 April 1977) is a French-born Malian former professional footballer who played as a defensive midfielder.

References

1977 births
Living people
Association football defenders
Citizens of Mali through descent
Malian footballers
Mali international footballers
French footballers
French people of Malian descent
Ligue 1 players
Ligue 2 players
Championnat National players
Championnat National 2 players
Championnat National 3 players
Red Star F.C. players
RC Strasbourg Alsace players
US Créteil-Lusitanos players
Stade de Reims players
Tours FC players
Stade Lavallois players
FCM Aubervilliers players
2002 African Cup of Nations players